Major Sir John Jacob "Jakie" Astor VII,   (29 August 1918 – 10 September 2000) was an English politician and sportsman. He was a member of the prominent Astor family.

Early life

John Jacob Astor VII (Jakie) was born 29 August 1918, the youngest of the four sons of Waldorf Astor, 2nd Viscount Astor and Nancy Astor, Viscountess Astor (1878–1964). His mother was the first woman elected to Parliament to take her seat in Parliament. His siblings include Robert Gould Shaw III (1898–1970), his half-brother from his mother's first marriage, William Waldorf Astor II (1907–1966), Nancy Phyllis Louise Astor (1909–1975), Francis David Langhorne Astor (1912–2001), and Michael Langhorne Astor (1916–1980). He was named after his relative John Jacob Astor IV, who perished on the Titanic in 1912.

Career

Education and military service
Educated at Eton and New College, Oxford, Astor then served in the Special Air Service and the Life Guards during World War II.

Public service
In 1945, Astor contested the Plymouth Sutton seat in the British House of Commons that had been held by both his parents. Unsuccessful at first, he won the seat in 1951 as a member of the Conservative Party.  From 1960 to 1974, he held the office of Justice of the Peace for Cambridgeshire.

In 1967, he was appointed High Sheriff of Cambridgeshire and Isle of Ely, serving until 1968.

Later career
Astor was a Thoroughbred horse racing enthusiast who won a number of prestigious races including the St. Leger Stakes. He owned the West Ilsley Stables, where Dick Hern trained.

In 1978 he was granted a knighthood for services to agriculture, due to his chairmanship of the Agricultural Research Council. and the success of his 1,900-acre farms at Hatley Park, his home in Cambridgeshire.

Personal life
Astor was married three times.  He married firstly on 23 October 1944 to Ana Inez "Chiquita" Carcano y Morra (1918–1992), daughter of the Argentine ambassador (from 1942 to 1946) and a prominent Catholic laywoman, which hurt his relationship with his mother. His mother had become a Christian Scientist. Ana's sister, Stella Carcano y Morra, married William Ward, 4th Earl of Dudley in 1946. Before their divorce in 1972, Jakie and Ana had three children:
 Michael Ramon Langhorne Astor (b. 1946), who married Daphne Warburg, daughter of Mary and Edward M. M. Warburg, in 1979.
 Stella Inez Astor (b. 1949)
 John William Astor (1962–1963), who died as an infant.

In 1976, he married secondly Susan Eveleigh Sheppard, that marriage too ended in divorce in 1985.

In 1988, he married thirdly Marcia de Savary, former wife of Peter de Savary, to whom he remained married until his death in 2000.

There were no children from the second or third marriages.

Honours and awards
Knight Bachelor 3 June 1978
Member of the Order of the British Empire 1 February 1945
Emergency Reserve Decoration 30 May 1989
Légion d'Honneur (France)
Croix de Guerre (France)

References
Notes

Sources

External links 
 

1918 births
2000 deaths
People educated at Eton College
Alumni of New College, Oxford
Jakie
English people of German descent
English people of American descent
British Army personnel of World War II
British Life Guards officers
British racehorse owners and breeders
Conservative Party (UK) MPs for English constituencies
English justices of the peace
Members of the Order of the British Empire
Knights Bachelor
Recipients of the Legion of Honour
Recipients of the Croix de Guerre 1939–1945 (France)
Special Air Service officers
UK MPs 1951–1955
UK MPs 1955–1959
Younger sons of viscounts
High Sheriffs of Cambridgeshire